Love was a Japanese pop/R&B vocal duo, produced by Hiro of Exile's production agency, LDH. They debuted in 2009 with the single "First Love: Love Letter." Their song "Tada Hitotsu no Negai Sae" was certified gold by the RIAJ for 100,000 full-length cellphone downloads.

The band's name comes from the first word in their production company (LDH)'s non-acronym name (Love Dream Happiness).

Biography 

The band was formed in 2008 by former Paradise Go!! Go!! member Misaki Matsumoto, and quarter Italian Stephanie. The pair met through production agency LDH, when they were given the roles of the two vocalists in a dance performance group called Real Force. When the plans for this unit fell through, the duo formed Love. Both members had been in the entertainment industry for over ten years.

The group's first activity together was releasing a cover of Zone's "Secret Base (Kimi ga Kureta Mono)" as a ringtone (as well as releasing the full version in a special CD attached to the August issue of Gekkan Exile magazine). A year later, the group released their debut single, "First Love: Love Letter," with this cover as a B-side.

The group's songs have been popular through digital markets, with all lead tracks from their singles reaching the top 5 on the RIAJ Digital Track Chart (including "Taisetsu na Kimochi" from their debut album Taisetsu na Kimochi which was not released as a physical single).

The duo have had two collaborations with Exile twice: once before their debut on the song "Love, Dream & Happiness" on Exile's compilation album Exile Ballad Best in 2008, and in 2009 Misaki recorded background vocals for Exile's song "If (I Know)" on their album Aisubeki Mirai e.

On the 28th of December 2012, it is announced that LOVE is dismissed after the year.

Discography

Albums

Singles

References

External links 
Official site 
Official blog 

Japanese pop music groups
Sony Music Entertainment Japan artists
Musical groups from Tokyo